Perth Charterhouse or Perth Priory, known in Latin as Domus Vallis Virtutis ("House of the Valley of Virtue"), was a monastic house of Carthusian monks based at Perth, Scotland. It was the only Carthusian house ever to be established in the Kingdom of Scotland, and one of the last non-mendicant houses to be founded in the kingdom. The traditional founding date of the house is 1429. Formal suppression of the house came in 1569, though this was not actualised until 1602.

King James VI Hospital now occupies the Priory's former location.

Carthusian Order
The Carthusian Order has its origin in the 11th century at La Grande Chartreuse in the Alps; Carthusian houses are small, and limited in number. Carrying the motto "Never reformed because never deformed", the Carthusians are the most ascetic and austere of all the European monastic orders, and the Order is regarded as the pinnacle of religious devotion to which monks from other orders are attracted when they were in need of greater spiritual challenges. In the first half of the 15th century, the Order experienced a renewal of secular patronage, including an attempted foundation by Archibald Douglas, 4th Earl of Douglas, in 1419.

Foundation
The traditional founding date of the house is 1429.  However, it was three years earlier, on 19 August 1426, that the Prior of La Grande Chartreuse, having received the consent of the General Chapter of the Carthusian Order, authorised the foundation of a house at Perth. King James used much of his own revenue as well as part of the ransom payment owed to the English crown, to begin work on the new house, as well as pressurising others to make grants; the Cistercian monk John of Bute was given responsibility for overseeing the construction of the priory. The priory may have been intended as a royal mausoleum, and King James I of Scotland (reigned 1424-1437), his queen Joan Beaufort (c.1404-1445) and queen Margaret Tudor (1489-1541), widow of James IV, were buried there. The first Prior of Perth, Oswald de Corda, was in office by 31 March 1429. Oswald was a Bavarian who served as vicar of the Grande Chartreuse; while there, he wrote a treatise on textual emendation.

Property
The monastery was founded at the instigation of King James, who on 31 March 1429, granted the proposed house a series of privileges. Coupar Angus Abbey and William Hay of Errol gave, "through fear" it was said by his grandson, the church of Errol in Gowrie; Coupar Angus had been the former rector and Hay the patron of the church of Errol, and both the abbey and the Hays of Errol tried to recover their rights after James I's death. There were also grants from Perth burgesses, perhaps under the same pressure. By 1434, the priory had control of the Hospital of St Mary Magdalene and the house of Augustinian canonesses of St Leonard, near Perth, which was suppressed in 1438 and its revenues transferred to the Charterhouse. The king also had plans to take Glen Dochart from the Earl of Atholl and give it to the house.

Development
The model house of the Carthusian Order was one prior and twelve brothers, following the example of Jesus Christ and his twelve apostles. It is likely therefore that the community of Perth Charterhouse usually consisted of this; however, a document from 1478 shows that at that time it consisted of a prior, fourteen choir-monks, two lay brothers and one novice. This was probably an aberration, and by 1529 the house was back down to the standard size. By 1558 there were only ten brothers.

As the house was the only Carthusian establishment in Scotland, Perth's place in the international Carthusian system was awkward. It was part of the Carthusian province of Picardy; between 1456 and 1460 it was part of the English province, but it was placed in the province of Geneva thereafter.

Reformation and dissolution

On 11 May 1559, the Charterhouse and the other religious houses of Perth were attacked and destroyed by Protestant "reformers"; one of the brothers was killed, four others fled abroad, while six monks chose to remain; two of those, the prior Adam Forman and a brother, fled in to foreign Carthusian houses in 1567. Of the four who remained in 1567, one was Adam Stewart, illegitimate son of King James V of Scotland, who for some time styled himself "Prior". King James VI of Scotland granted the buildings and the gardens of the house to the burgh of Perth on 9 August 1569, though the house remained in notional operation, being held by commendators until 1602. The final suppression of the monastery in that year probably relates to the reissuing of King James VI's 1569 charter in 1600.

Of the Priory buildings, said to be 'of wondrous cost and greatness', nothing survives above ground. Excavations have failed to identify the exact location. The name Pomarium Street, for modern housing near the site of the medieval buildings, recalls the site of the house's orchard, which seems to have survived into the 18th century. Perth bus station now occupies part of Pomarium Street.

Burials
James I of Scotland (1394–1437)
Joan Beaufort, Queen of Scots (c.1404–1445)
Margaret Tudor, Queen of Scots (1489–1541)

The stone slab which covered the tomb of James and his queen can be seen in St John's Kirk.

See also
 Prior of Perth, for a list of priors and commendators
 Adam of Dryburgh
 Bruno of Cologne
 Witham Friary

Notes

References
 Bartlett, Robert, England Under the Norman and Angevin Kings, 1075-1225, (Oxford, 2000)
 Brown, Michael, James I, (East Linton, 1994)
 Cowan, Ian B. & Easson, David E., Medieval Religious Houses: Scotland With an Appendix on the Houses in the Isle of Man, Second Edition, (London, 1976)
 Lawson, John Parker, The Book of Perth: An Illustration of the Moral and Ecclesiastical State of Scotland before and after the Reformation, with Introduction, Observations, and Notes, (Edinburgh, 1847)
 Stevenson, Joseph, (ed.) & Elphinstone, William, The Life and Death of King James the First of Scotland, (Edinburgh, 1837)
 Watt, D. E. R., & Shead, N. F. (eds.), The Heads of Religious Houses in Scotland from the 12th to the 16th Centuries, The Scottish Records Society, New Series, Volume 24, (Edinburgh, 2001)
 Oswaldi de Corda Opus pacis (Turnhout : Brepols, 2001)

1429 establishments in Scotland
1569 establishments in Scotland
Religious organizations established in the 1420s
Christian monasteries established in the 15th century
Carthusian monasteries in the United Kingdom
History of Perth, Scotland
Religious buildings and structures in Perth, Scotland
Religion in Perth and Kinross
Former Christian monasteries in Scotland